Talbot was an electoral ward of Trafford covering parts of Stretford and Old Trafford.

The ward was abolished in 2004, and most of its area incorporated into the new Gorse Hill Ward.

Its electoral history since 1973 is as follows:

References

External links
Trafford Council

Wards of Trafford
1974 establishments in England
2004 disestablishments in England